Pauly (also spelled Pauli and Poli) is a coastal village in southwestern Ivory Coast. It is in the sub-prefecture of Sassandra, Sassandra Department, Gbôklé Region, Bas-Sassandra District. Pauly is sometimes subdivided into the villages of Pauly Brousse, which is half a kilometre inland, and Pauly Plage, which is on the seashore.

Pauly was a commune until March 2012, when it became one of 1126 communes nationwide that were abolished.

Notes

Former communes of Ivory Coast
Populated places in Bas-Sassandra District
Populated places in Gbôklé